Lavender Peak may refer to:

 Lavender Peak (British Columbia), Canada, a mountain in the Coast Mountains
 Lavender Peak (Colorado), United States, a mountain in the La Plata Mountains